Tielieketi is located in Yumin County in Xinjiang, the People's Republic of China, adjacent to the border with Kazakhstan. The name comes from the Terekty River, an intermittent stream which flows China to Kazakhstan.

Tielieketi incident
The Tielieketi military incident between Soviet and Chinese border troops (known in Soviet sources as "the border conflict near Lake Zhalanashkol" occurred on August 13, 1969,  during the Sino-Soviet split. The Soviet force eliminated a unit of about 30 Chinese soldiers, capturing four.

Soviet sources allege the August 13 clash between Soviet border guards and a Chinese force happened after persistent violation of the Chinese-Soviet border by Chinese soldiers starting the previous night. According to these sources, the Chinese military unit which took part in the incident was equipped with cameras and a professional video camera.

Consequences
After the Soviet Union dissolved in 1990s, Tielieketi was administered by Kazakhstan. In 1999, China and Kazakhstan signed a joint declaration to resolve their long-term border issues, and Tielieketi was ceded to China.

References

 

Geography of Xinjiang

Conflicts in 1969
1969 in China
1969 in the Soviet Union
China–Soviet Union relations
Territorial disputes of China
China–Soviet Union border
Territorial disputes of the Soviet Union